Amin Mohammed Jan Bukhari (born 2 May 1997) is a Saudi Arabian professional footballer who plays as a goalkeeper for Saudi Professional League side Al-Nassr.

Career
Bukhari started his career at the youth team of Al-Ittihad and represented the club at every level except the senior level. On 29 January 2020, Bukhari joined Al-Nassr on a free transfer. He signed a three-year contract with the club. On 16 October 2020, joined to Al-Ain on loan of the season from Al-Nassr.

Career statistics

Club

Notes

Honours
Individual
 Saudi Professional League Goalkeeper of the Month: November 2020

References

External links
 

1997 births
Living people
Sportspeople from Jeddah
Saudi Arabian footballers
Saudi Arabia youth international footballers
Association football goalkeepers
Ittihad FC players
Al Nassr FC players
Al-Ain FC (Saudi Arabia) players
Saudi Professional League players
Olympic footballers of Saudi Arabia
Footballers at the 2020 Summer Olympics